Tyrese John Haliburton (born February 29, 2000) Is an American professional basketball player for the Indiana Pacers of the National Basketball Association (NBA). He played college basketball for the Iowa State Cyclones and was drafted by the Sacramento Kings in the 2020 NBA draft. In 2022, Haliburton was acquired by the Indiana Pacers as part of a trade package for Domantas Sabonis. In 2023, he was named to his first All-Star Game as an East reserve.

Born in Milwaukee, Wisconsin, Haliburton was a consensus three-star recruit from Oshkosh North High School, whom he led to a state championship in his senior season. As a freshman with Iowa State, he set the program's single-game assists record. He had breakout success as a sophomore and was named to the second team All-Big 12 Conference despite suffering a season-ending wrist injury.

In 2019, Haliburton led the United States to a gold medal and earned all-tournament team honors at the FIBA Under-19 World Cup in Heraklion, Greece.

High school career
Haliburton played basketball for Oshkosh North High School in Oshkosh, Wisconsin. As a sophomore, he was named to the All-Fox Valley Association (FVA) second team and defensive team. In his junior season, Haliburton averaged 18 points, six assists, and five rebounds per game, earning FVA Player of the Year and Wisconsin Basketball Coaches Association (WBCA) Division I All-State accolades with his team falling just short of the State Tournament.

As a senior, he averaged 22.9 points, 6.2 assists, 5.1 rebounds, 3.5 steals and 1.7 blocks per game, leading Oshkosh North to a 26–1 record. On February 18, 2018, he scored a career-high 42 points in a win over Kaukauna High School and West Virginia recruit Jordan Mccabe. Haliburton scored 31 points, including 24 in the second half, and shot 18–of–18 from the free throw line in a Wisconsin Interscholastic Athletic Association Division I state championship victory over Brookfield East High School, his program's first state title. He was named Oshkosh Northwestern All-Area Player of the Year, Wisconsin Gatorade Player of the Year, and FVA co-Player of the Year. Haliburton was selected to the WBCA Division I All-State team and the USA Today All-USA Wisconsin first team.

Recruiting
Considered a three-star recruit by major recruiting services, he committed to playing college basketball for Iowa State on September 18, 2017.

College career
On November 6, 2018, Haliburton made his college debut for Iowa State, posting 12 points, four rebounds, and four assists in a 79–53 win over Alabama State. He scored a season-high 16 points in an 82–55 victory against Omaha on November 26. On December 9, Haliburton recorded 15 points and 17 assists, with one turnover, in a 101–65 win over Southern. His 17 assists were the most by an Iowa State player in any game, surpassing the previous record set by Eric Heft in 1974. Through 35 appearances in his freshman season, Haliburton averaged 6.8 points, 3.6 assists, and 1.5 steals per game. He was the only NCAA Division I true freshman, other than Zion Williamson, to accumulate at least 50 steals and 30 blocks. Haliburton had an assist-to-turnover ratio of 4.5, which led the Big 12 Conference and ranked second in Division I.

Haliburton was named Big 12 Player of the Week on November 11, 2019, during his sophomore season, after averaging 13.5 points and 13.0 assists in wins over Mississippi Valley State and Oregon State. On November 27, he scored a season-high 25 points, to go with nine rebounds and five assists, in an 83–76 loss to Michigan at the Battle 4 Atlantis. On January 4, 2020, Haliburton recorded 22 points, 12 rebounds and 10 assists in an overtime loss to TCU, the first triple-double by an Iowa State player since Monté Morris in 2016. He was subsequently named Big 12 Player of the Week for the second time. After fracturing his left wrist on February 8 during a game against Kansas State, Haliburton was ruled out for the rest of the season. He averaged 15.2 points, 5.9 rebounds, 6.5 assists and 2.5 steals per game as a sophomore. Haliburton was named to the second team All-Big 12. After the season, he announced that he would enter the 2020 NBA draft and forgo his remaining college basketball eligibility.

Professional career

Sacramento Kings (2020–2022)

2020–21 season: All-Rookie honors
Haliburton was selected with the 12th pick  by the Sacramento Kings in the first round of the 2020 NBA draft. On November 27, 2020, the Kings officially announced they had signed Haliburton. On December 23, 2020, Haliburton made his NBA debut, coming off the bench in a 124–122 overtime win over the Denver Nuggets with 12 points, four assists, two rebounds and a block. On April 14, 2021, Haliburton recorded a career–high 6 steals in a 123–111 loss to the Washington Wizards.

On May 2, 2021, Haliburton suffered a left knee injury against the Dallas Mavericks. Although an MRI later revealed no ligament damage, it was announced Haliburton would miss the last seven games of the 2020–21 season for the Kings as precaution. After the season, Haliburton finished third in Rookie of the Year voting and was named to the NBA All-Rookie First Team.

2021–22 season: Sophomore season and mid–season trade
On January 29, 2022, Haliburton scored his Kings career-high 38 points along with seven assists, three rebounds, and two steals in a 103–101 loss against the Philadelphia 76ers. On February 5, Haliburton posted his Kings career-high 17 assists, along with 13 points, six rebounds, and two steals in a 113–103 win over the Oklahoma City Thunder.

Indiana Pacers (2022–present)
On February 8, 2022, Haliburton, Buddy Hield, and Tristan Thompson were traded to the Pacers in exchange for Domantas Sabonis, Justin Holiday, Jeremy Lamb, and a 2023 second-round pick. On February 11, Haliburton made his Pacers debut in a 120–113 loss to the Cleveland Cavaliers, logging 23 points in addition to 6 assists, 3 rebounds, and 3 steals. On February 13, in his second game with the Pacers, Haliburton posted 22 points and 16 assists in a loss to the Minnesota Timberwolves. On February 16, Haliburton recorded 21 points and 14 assists in his first win with the Pacers, defeating the Washington Wizards 113–108. 

Haliburton and Desmond Bane were the winners of the 2022 Clorox Clutch Challenge, an event for the 75th season at the 2022 NBA–All Star Weekend. On March 23, in the first game against his former team, Haliburton recorded 13 points, 15 assists, and 3 steals in a one–point loss to the Sacramento Kings. On April 1, Haliburton scored 30 points in 25 minutes on an efficient 10–11 shooting from the field, 6–6 from three, and 4–4 from the free–throw line, in a loss to the Boston Celtics. The next game, on April 3, Haliburton tallied a near triple–double with 19 points, 17 assists, 9 rebounds, and 0 turnovers against the Detroit Pistons, recording the most assists in a game by a Pacer since T.J. McConnell in the 2020–21 season.

2022–23 season: First All–Star selection
On October 19, 2022, in the season–opener, Haliburton scored 26 points and dished out 7 assists in a loss to the Washington Wizards. On November 21, Haliburton was selected Eastern Conference Player of the Week, leading the Pacers to a 3–0 record while averaging 21 points, 11 assists, and 4 rebounds. On November 29, Haliburton became the first player in NBA history to record 40+ assists and 0 turnovers in a 3–game stretch, averaging 20 points, 13.3 assists, 6 rebounds, and 2.3 steals per game. On December 10, Haliburton recorded 35 points on 12–15 shooting from the field and 7–8 from three, along with 9 assists and 3 steals in a 136–133 loss against the Brooklyn Nets. On December 21, in a 117–112 win against the Boston Celtics, Haliburton tallied 33 points, 8 assists, on 12–24 shooting from the field and 6–13 from three. Two days later, on December 23, Haliburton made a game–winning three–pointer and finished with a career-high 43 points on a Pacers franchise-record 10 three-pointers made along with seven assists in a 121–118 win over the Miami Heat.

On January 12, 2023, Haliburton missed two weeks due to elbow and knee injuries, with the team going 1–9 in his absence. In his return on February 2nd, against the Los Angeles Lakers, Haliburton tallied 26 points, 12 assists, and 2 steals. On February 13, Haliburton scored 30 points on 12–24 shooting, along with 12 assists and 3 steals in a loss against the Utah Jazz. Haliburton was named to his first ever NBA All–Star Game in 2023 as a reserve guard for the Eastern Conference, recording 18 points, 3 assists, and a rebound. Haliburton and teammate Buddy Hield were selected to participate in the 2023 NBA Three-Point Contest, where they both lost in the finals to Damian Lillard. On February 28, Haliburton scored 32 points on 9–18 shooting, along with 7 rebounds and 6 assists in a 124–122 win over the Dallas Mavericks. On March 5, Haliburton made his second game–winning three–pointer of the season in a 125–122 win against the Chicago Bulls, finishing with 29 points on 11–17 field–goals, 6–9 from three, along with 11 assists. The next day, on March 6, against the Philadelphia 76ers, Haliburton posted his 30th double–double of the season with 40 points and 16 assists, becoming the first player in Pacers franchise history to record 30+ points and 15+ assists in a single game. The next game, on March 9, Haliburton scored 29 points while dishing out a career–high 19 assists in a 134–125 overtime win over the Houston Rockets.

National team career
Haliburton played for the United States at the 2019 FIBA Under-19 World Cup in Heraklion, Greece. On June 30, he scored a team-high 21 points, shooting 8–of–9 from the field, in a 102–84 group stage win over Lithuania. Haliburton averaged 7.9 points and 6.9 assists per game, shooting 69 percent from the field. He led the United States to a gold medal and was named to the all-tournament team.

Career statistics

NBA

|-
| style="text-align:left;"|
| style="text-align:left;"|Sacramento
| 58 || 20 || 30.1 || .472 || .409 || .857 || 3.0 || 5.3 || 1.3 || .5 || 13.0
|-
| style="text-align:left;"rowspan=2|
| style="text-align:left;"|Sacramento
| 51 || 51 || 34.5 || .457 || .413 || .837 || 3.9 || 7.4 || 1.7 || .7 || 14.3
|-
| style="text-align:left;"|Indiana
| 26 || 26 || 36.1 || .502 || .416 || .849 || 4.3 || 9.6 || 1.8 || .6 || 17.5
|- class="sortbottom"
| style="text-align:center;" colspan="2"|Career
| 135 || 97 || 32.9 || .473 || .412 || .846 || 3.6 || 6.9 || 1.6 || .6 || 14.3
|- class="sortbottom"
| style="text-align:center;" colspan="2"| All-Star
| 1 || 0 || 14.0 || .778 || .667 || – || 1.0 || 3.0 || .0 || .0 || 18.0

College

|-
| style="text-align:left;"|2018–19
| style="text-align:left;"|Iowa State
| 35 || 34 || 33.2 || .515 || .434 || .692 || 3.4 || 3.6 || 1.5 || .9 || 6.8
|-
| style="text-align:left;"|2019–20
| style="text-align:left;"|Iowa State
| 22 || 22 || 36.7 || .504 || .419 || .822 || 5.9 || 6.5 || 2.5 || .7 || 15.2
|- class="sortbottom"
| style="text-align:center;" colspan="2"|Career
| 57 || 56 || 34.6 || .509 || .426 || .775 || 4.4 || 4.7 || 1.9 || .8 || 10.1

Personal life
Haliburton's father, John, is a referee, but not in the NBA. Haliburton is a cousin of former basketball player Eddie Jones, who had a 14-year NBA career and was a three-time NBA All-Star. He is also the cousin of current Orlando Magic player Jalen Suggs.

References

External links
Iowa State Cyclones bio

2000 births
Living people
20th-century African-American sportspeople
21st-century African-American sportspeople
African-American basketball players
American men's basketball players
Basketball players from Wisconsin
Indiana Pacers players
Iowa State Cyclones men's basketball players
Point guards
Sacramento Kings draft picks
Sacramento Kings players
Sportspeople from Oshkosh, Wisconsin